These are all the matches played by the Spain national football team between 2000 and 2009:

Meaning

Results
130 matches played:

2000

2001

2002

2003

2004

2005

2006

2007

2008

UEFA Euro 2008

2009

References

External links
Todos los partidos (all the games) at Selección Española de Fútbol (official site)

2000s in Spanish sport
2000
1999–2000 in Spanish football
2000–01 in Spanish football
2001–02 in Spanish football
2002–03 in Spanish football
2003–04 in Spanish football
2004–05 in Spanish football
2005–06 in Spanish football
2006–07 in Spanish football
2007–08 in Spanish football
2008–09 in Spanish football
2009–10 in Spanish football